The 1952 Arizona State–Flagstaff Lumberjacks football team was an American football team that represented Arizona State College at Flagstaff (now known as Northern Arizona University) in the Border Conference during the 1952 college football season. In its second year under head coach John Pederson, the team compiled a 2–4 record (0–1 against conference opponents), was outscored by a total of 121 to 92, and finished last of eight teams in the Border Conference.  The team also played  and led, 13–7, but the game was declared "no contest" after played was halted when the field lights failed.

The team played its home games at Skidmore Field in Flagstaff, Arizona. Key players included quarterback Howard Miller, a transfer from Orange Coast Junior College, fullback Jim Bryan, halfbacks Branch Gill and Bill Hannah, tackle Marvin Hardis, and ends Frank Cottrell and Frank Gomez.

Schedule

References

Arizona State-Flagstaff
Northern Arizona Lumberjacks football seasons
Arizona State-Flagstaff Lumberjacks football